Blairmore may refer to:

Australia 

 Blairmore, Queensland, a locality in the North Burnett Region

Canada 

Blairmore, Alberta, a town in Canada

Scotland 

Blairmore, Argyll, a village on the Cowal peninsula, Argyll and Bute
Blairmore, Sutherland, a rural settlement in Highland
Blairmore School, a former independent school in Aberdeenshire

Other uses 

Blairmore Holdings, a company